M Train or M-Train may refer to:
M-Train, a former operator of half of Melbourne's suburban railway network and a former Melbourne tram service (2001–2004)
M (New York City Subway service)
MTR M-Train EMU or MTR Metro Cammell EMU, metro rolling stock of Hong Kong
Train M, a former service of Helsinki commuter rail
M Train (book), a 2015 book by Patti Smith
The M-Train Tour, Meghan Trainor's second tour

See also
M-Bahn, a former Berlin magnetic levitation train (1989–1991)
M line (disambiguation)
 M (disambiguation)